Zabeen Hirji (born 1960) is a former Chief Human Resources Officer and a former member of the Royal Bank of Canada (RBC) Group Executive in Toronto from 2007 - 2017. A native of Tanzania, she immigrated to Vancouver, Canada, in 1974 and joined the RBC as a teller in 1977, advancing through various departments until acceding to her current position in 2007. She is a prominent advocate and spokesperson for diversity and inclusion in Canadian business, and has received numerous awards for championing the advancement of women and minorities. She was listed in the 2001 edition of Who's Who in Canadian Business and the 2009 edition of Canadian Who's Who.

Early life and education
Zabeen Hirji was born in Tanzania to parents of Indian and other South Asian origin. Her father died in an automobile accident; she and her mother immigrated to Vancouver, Canada, when she was 14. She earned her MBA at Simon Fraser University, British Columbia, in 1994, submitting the thesis, "A Strategic Analysis of a Toronto Family Medicine Practice". In 1997 she completed the Advanced Human Resources Executive Program at the Ross School of Business, University of Michigan.

Career
She began working for the Royal Bank of Canada as a teller while attending university part-time in 1977. Over the next two decades, she advanced in positions in retail banking, training, operations, credit card operations, and human resources. From 1994 to 1997 she was the Regional Manager of Card Services for Central Canada. In 1997 she was appointed Vice President of Human Resources, and in 2001, Senior Vice President. In 2007 she was promoted to Executive Vice President and Chief Human Resources Officer, giving her global responsibility for human resources operations and strategies for nearly 79,000 employees in 50 countries. Together with senior management, she conceives and develops strategic initiatives to increase diversity and inclusion in hiring and talent management. She is also in charge of brand, communications, and corporate citizenship. She is a member of the bank's Group Executive, and one of ten executives who determine the RBC's "overall strategy direction".

Diversity advocate
Hirji is an advocate and spokesperson for diversity and inclusion in Canadian business. In 2001 she co-led the founding of the RBC's Diversity Leadership Council, a global initiative that brings together senior business executives from many fields. Among the strategic initiatives Hirji has introduced at the RBC are a Diversity Dialogues Reciprocal Mentoring Program, which pairs senior managers with junior employees from minority backgrounds for mutual encouragement, and "hidden bias" training. According to Hirji, the RBC "actively targets recent immigrants, women entrepreneurs, Canadian Aboriginals, the gay and lesbian community and people with disabilities".

Affiliations
She is a fellow of the Institute of Canadian Bankers. She is co-chair of the Toronto Region Immigrant Employment Council, director of the Greater Toronto CivicAction Alliance, director of the Mosaic Institute, and a member of the DiverseCity Steering Committee. In 2005 she was named a fellow of Centennial College.

Honors and awards
Hirji was listed in the 2001 edition of Who's Who in Canadian Business and the 2009 edition of Canadian Who's Who.

In 2017, she received the 2017 Ivey Business School Lifetime Achievement Award in HR Industry – Canadian HR Awards. In 2016 she was recognized with Canada's Meritorious Service Medal for Advancing Diversity and Inclusion and the Outstanding Alumni Award for Professional Achievement from Simon Fraser University.

In 2014 she received the Catalyst Canada honour for championing the advancement of women and minorities in Canadian business.

In 2011 and 2014 she was named one of the Top 25 Women of Influence by the Women of Influence organization. She was inducted into that organization's Canada's Most Powerful Women: Top 100 Hall of Fame in 2012.

In 2010 she was honored as Corporate Executive of the Year by the Indo-Canada Chamber of Commerce.

References

External links
"Overcoming Hidden Biases At Work" by Zabeen Hirji and Stephen Shea, Canadian HR Reporter, April 29, 2014
"Who's News: Zabeen Hirji, MBA '94" Simon Fraser University, April 2015

1960 births
Living people
Canadian people of Gujarati descent
Canadian women business executives
Simon Fraser University alumni
Tanzanian emigrants to Canada
Businesspeople from Toronto
Royal Bank of Canada people
Canadian Ismailis
Tanzanian Ismailis
Human resource management people
Ross School of Business alumni
Women corporate executives
Canadian people of Indian descent